Flight Deck is a steel inverted roller coaster located at Canada's Wonderland in Vaughan, Ontario, Canada. It originally opened in 1995 under the name Top Gun until it was renamed in 2008 to Flight Deck, after Paramount Parks sold Wonderland to Cedar Fair which necessitated the gradual removal of all Paramount names and trademarks from the theme park.

History
The roller coaster is based on the 1986 film Top Gun (produced by Paramount Pictures, a sister company of Paramount Parks), and the ride is meant to simulate the feeling of riding in an F-14 fighter jet. The ride is themed heavily after the movie with various props alongside the line-up including models of the F-14 aircraft, hangars, radar installations, army trucks and informational posters about the making of the movie. Since its early inception, the ride was known as the flagship ride in the park, finally losing that distinction to Behemoth in 2008.

When Vekoma announced the 689m Standard Suspended Looping Coaster, Paramount had cancelled their plans with Bolliger & Mabillard (B&M) to make an inverted coaster to go on the land where Behemoth currently stands on due to Cedar Point's contract on having no B&M inverted coaster in the  radius of a Cedar Fair park. The ride was built where "Zumba Flume" (a water log ride) was once located. The "Top Gun" movie theme was a shift in the design of the park. The ride no longer was themed to match the "land" in which it was situated. The ride was renamed Flight Deck in 2008, following the park's sale to Cedar Fair.

Characteristics

Station

The station of Flight Deck is one of the most themed stations in the park with the station of Time Warp coming close after it. Flight Deck's station is shaped like a hangar for airplanes. The line up for the ride is under the hangar as the line up curves back-and-forth between the two sides of the hangar. The trains for Flight Deck wait under the hangar too. Around the hangar are many military objects that are themed to the movie Top Gun. Some of these objects include trucks, airplanes, and radar.

The colours of Flight Deck match in with the theme of Top Gun. The supports of the track are coloured grey and the track itself is coloured with a much lighter shade of grey. The trains on Flight Deck are coloured mainly red, but also have a bit of white on the backs of the seats. The station for Flight Deck is coloured all grey.

Rider requirements
Riders may not carry loose items during the ride. Riders are encouraged to remove glasses and hats due to the high velocity of the ride. Onlookers will notice many guests riding in their bare feet as flip flops and sandals can come off very easily.

Ride mechanics
Flight Deck features a number of roller coaster elements including a sea serpent roll (two inversions), a sidewinder loop, and a double inline twist. Then, the trains go down the hill which does a 90 degree turn to the right on the way down, speeding at 80 km/h. At the bottom of the first drop, the passenger's feet are just a couple of feet away from the ground. The ride has many near miss effects with the ground, track and supports. After that, the roller coaster's train goes through a half loop, an inline roll and then another half loop, followed by an overbanking turn and a sidewinder loop. Next, Flight Deck's trains go through a 180 degree turn and through two barrel rolls. Lastly, the trains make another 180 turn and head into the final brake run.

Trains

The trains to Flight Deck are inverted, meaning that the passengers' feet hang free with no floor under them.

Flight Deck has two trains working all the time. Each of the two trains has ten cars, and each of the cars can hold two people. Therefore, each train can hold 20 passengers at a time and 40 passengers can ride Flight Deck at a time. The cars of Flight Deck's trains have a shoulder harness which is attached to the bottom of the seat with seatbelts.

The trains were originally named Maverick and Iceman, going along with the callsigns of the two pilots in the Top Gun film. For the 2010 season, the trains were renamed Firehawk and Raptor.

In popular culture
A scene from the TV show Flashpoint was filmed on the evacuation stairs of Flight Deck during the 2008–2009 offseason. The episode aired on April 10, 2009, and is titled "The Perfect Family".

References

External links

 

Roller coasters introduced in 1995
Roller coasters in Ontario
Roller coasters operated by Cedar Fair
Aviation attractions